Gottlob Honold (26 August 1876 – 17 March 1923) was the leading engineer in the workshop of Robert Bosch and, with Bosch, was the inventor of the spark plug and the modern internal combustion engine, as well as headlights.  The combination of the Bosch spark plug and the high voltage magneto, a process patented on 7 January 1902, made it possible for the gasoline-powered engine to become the standard for motor vehicles.  

Honold was born on 26 August 1876 in Langenau, in Germany, about 10 miles northeast of Ulm.  Honold's father was a friend of the father of Robert Bosch, and in 1891, Honold first worked in Bosch's Stuttgart workshop at the age of 14.  Following graduation from the Ulm gymnasium, Honold studied engineering at the Stuttgart technical university.  In 1901, Honold accepted an offer to become the technical manager of Bosch's company, and worked on the task of developing an improved ignition system for combustion engines.  The Daimler company ordered the Bosch engine and was soon breaking automotive speed records.   Honold continued work on faster and more powerful engines.

In 1913, Honold helped develop the automotive headlights that are used today.  Although lights had been used to some extent for night driving, the early lanterns did little more than to draw attention to a vehicle, and were of little use for illumination.  It was Honold who conceived the idea of placing curved mirrors behind the lamp to increase the amount of light without taxing the automotive electrical system.  Honold also helped develop the Bosch car horn.  Honold died in Stuttgart on 17 March 1923.

See also 
German inventors and discoverers

1876 births
1923 deaths
People from Langenau
People from the Kingdom of Württemberg
Robert Bosch GmbH